This is the discography of South Korean idol group B1A4. B1A4 debuted on April 23, 2011 on the weekly music show Show! Music Core aired on MBC the group currently has released nine studio albums, one reissue, fourteen compilation albums, seven extended plays, and various singles. Into a year upon debuting, the boys of B1A4 made their foray into the Japanese market with a Japanese version of "Beautiful Target" released on June 27, 2012. The group released their first Japanese album entitled 1 on October 24 that same year.

Albums

Studio albums

Reissues

Compilation albums

Extended plays

Singles

Other charted songs

Featurings

Soundtrack appearances

Music videos

Collaboration

Notes

References 

Discographies of South Korean artists
K-pop music group discographies
Discography